Holly M. Kirby (born July 9, 1957) is an American jurist who served as a judge on the Tennessee Court of Appeals from 1995 to 2013 and was appointed to the Tennessee Supreme Court by Tennessee Governor Bill Haslam in December 2013.

Kirby was born in Memphis, Tennessee, and graduated from Columbia Central High School in Columbia, Tennessee. She attended Memphis State University, where she received a bachelor's degree in mechanical engineering in 1979 as the top-ranked graduate in the university's College of Engineering. She then enrolled in the Memphis State University Law School, graduating in 1982 as the third-ranked member of the class of 140. After completing her Juris Doctor degree there, she served as a judicial law clerk to Judge Harry  W. Wellford on the U.S. Court of Appeals for the Sixth Circuit.

In 1983, Kirby joined the Memphis law firm of Burch, Porter and Johnson, where she specialized in defending businesses in employment-related litigation. In 1990 she became a partner in the firm.

References

1957 births
Living people
People from Memphis, Tennessee
Tennessee state court judges
Justices of the Tennessee Supreme Court
University of Memphis alumni
Tennessee lawyers
21st-century American judges
21st-century American women judges